HMS Portchester Castle was a  built in 1943 and scrapped in 1958. She was the only ship of the Royal Navy to be named after Portchester Castle in Hampshire, and was used for the 1952 film The Cruel Sea, in which she played Saltash Castle.

Construction and career
She was launched on 21 June 1943 at Swan Hunter shipyard in Newcastle upon Tyne.

Sinking of U-484

Sinking of U-1200

Decommissioning
She was paid off in 1947.

Film appearances
In 1951 Portchester Castle was employed to represent the fictitious HMS Saltash Castle in the film The Cruel Sea (1953). The ship was also seen in the film The Man Who Never Was (1955) and The Navy Lark (1959). In both Sea and Lark she is shown wearing the pennant number F362 rather than her own K362.

Fate
She was scrapped at Troon, Scotland on 14 May 1958.

References

Citations

Sources
 
 Rayner, D.A., Escort: The Battle of the Atlantic, London:William Kimber, pp. 224–229

 

Castle-class corvettes
1943 ships